The Antigua and Barbuda Public Service Association (ABPSA) is a national Trade union of Antigua and Barbuda. First recognized in the 1980s, the ABPSA is a small organization with competition from other unions in the public service sector.

See also

 List of trade unions

References

External links
 www.icftu.org entry in ITUC address book.

Trade Union Confederation of the Americas
Trade unions in Antigua and Barbuda